Alexandre José Vidal Porto is a Brazilian writer. He is a diplomat and holds an LLM from the Harvard Law School.

Alexandre Vidal Porto is also a columnist for the Brazilian newspaper Folha de S.Paulo.

Bibliography 
Matias na Cidade (2005)
 Sérgio Y. vai à América (2014); English translation, Sergio Y. (2016)
Cloro (2018)

References 

Brazilian diplomats
Gay diplomats
Gay politicians
Brazilian gay writers
Brazilian LGBT politicians
Harvard Law School alumni
Living people
Year of birth missing (living people)
21st-century LGBT people